Clinus helenae, the Helen's klipfish, is a species of clinid that occurs in subtropical waters of the Atlantic Ocean around South Africa where it is a denizen of tide pools.  This species can reach a maximum length of  TL. The identity of the person honoured in the matronym in this species' specific name is thought to be J.L.B. Smith's mother-in-law Helen Evelyn Zondagh (1877-1951).

References

helenae
Fish described in 1946